Pebble is a discontinued smartwatch developed by Pebble Technology Corporation. Funding was conducted through a Kickstarter campaign running from April 11, 2012, to May 18, 2012, which raised $10.3 million; it was the most funded project in Kickstarter history, at the time. Pebble began shipping watches to Kickstarter backers in January 2013. Pebble watches can be connected to Android and iOS devices to show notifications and messages. An online app store distributed Pebble-compatible apps from many developers including ESPN, Uber, Runkeeper, and GoPro.

A steel-bodied variant to the original Pebble, the Pebble Steel, was announced at CES 2014 and released in February 2014. It has a thinner body, tactile metal buttons, and a Corning Gorilla Glass screen. It comes in 2 variations: a black matte finish and a brushed stainless steel finish, with both a black leather band and a matching steel band.

In 2015, Pebble launched its second generation of smartwatches: the Pebble Time and Time Steel. The devices were similarly funded through Kickstarter, raising $20.3 million from over 75,000 backers and breaking records for the site. In 2016, Pebble shut down their subsequent Time 2 series watches and refunded Kickstarter backers, citing financial issues.

On December 7, 2016, Pebble officially announced that the company would be shut down, and would no longer manufacture or continue support for any devices, nor honor any existing warranties. Pebble's intellectual property was purchased by Fitbit, a wearable technology company specializing in fitness tracking, who also hired some of the Pebble staff. Further clarification on the transition timeline and efforts to render Pebble OS and its watchfaces/apps more self-sufficient was posted to the Pebble Dev Blog on December 14, 2016. Support for the Pebble app store, online forum, cloud development tool, voice recognition, and voice replies ceased in June 2018, although support for some online services was restored by the unofficial "Rebble" community.

History

Development 
The original Pebble Smartwatch was designed based on a concept by Eric Migicovsky describing a watch that could display messages from a smartphone and select Android devices. Migicovsky successfully took his idea through the Y Combinator business incubator program, and unusually for a startup company at Y Combinator, Migicovsky's business actually generated revenue during the program. Migicovsky was able to raise US$375,000 from angel investors such as Tim Draper of Draper Fisher Jurvetson, but was unable to raise additional funds. Discussing his inability to raise further funds, Migicovsky told the Los Angeles Times, "I wasn't extremely surprised... hardware is much harder to raise money for. We were hoping we could convince some people to our vision, but it didn't work out."

Funding
After raising venture capital for the product under their former name, Allerta (which had already developed and sold the inPulse smartwatch for BlackBerry devices), the company failed to attract traditional investors under their new Pebble brand name, so the company pursued crowd funding in April 2012.

Backers spending $115 would receive a Pebble when they became available ($99 for the first 200), effectively pre-ordering the $150 Pebble at a discounted price. Within two hours of going live, the project had met its $100,000 goal, and within six days, the project had become the most funded project in the history of Kickstarter to that point, raising over $4.7 million with 30 days left in the campaign.

On , Pebble Technology announced they were limiting the number of pre-orders. On , funding closed with $10,266,845 pledged by 68,929 people. At the time, the product held the world record for the most money raised for a Kickstarter project.

Production 
Pebble worked with consulting firm Dragon Innovation to identify suppliers and manufacturers. After overcoming manufacturability difficulties with the prototype design, Pebble started mass production with manufacturer Foxlink Group in January 2013 with an initial production of 15,000 watches per week.

Features

Hardware 

The watch has a  144 × 168 pixel black and white memory LCD using an ultra low-power "transflective LCD" manufactured by Sharp; it contains a backlight, vibrating motor, magnetometer, ambient light sensors, and three-axis accelerometer. It can communicate with an Android or iOS device using both Bluetooth 2.1 and Bluetooth 4.0 (Bluetooth Low Energy) through Stonestreet One's Bluetopia+MFi software stack. Bluetooth 4.0 with low energy (LE) was not initially supported, but was later added through a firmware update in November 2013. The watch is charged through a modified USB-cable that attaches magnetically to the watch to maintain water resistance capability, with a reported seven-day battery life. Water-resistance was added during development based on feedback from Kickstarter backers.

Software 
, the Pebble app store contained over 1,000 applications. Applications included notification support for emails, calls, text messages and social media activity; stock prices; activity tracking (movement, sleep, estimates of calories burned); remote controls for smartphones, cameras and home appliances; turn-by-turn directions (using the GPS receiver in a smartphone or tablet); display of RSS or JSON feeds; and hundreds of custom watch faces.

The Pebble was originally slated to ship with its apps pre-installed, including a cycling app to measure speed, distance, and pace through GPS, and a golf rangefinder app supporting more than 25,000 courses. These apps use data received from a connected phone for distance, speed and range information. More apps are downloadable via a mobile phone or tablet, and an SDK is freely available. Not all apps were pre-installed when the watch was originally shipped, but CEO Eric Migicovsky announced on January 9, 2013, that updates for the watch's operating system would be released every 2–3 weeks until all features were added.

Pebble integrates with any phone or tablet application that sends out native iOS or Android notifications including from any app, including text messaging and phone call apps.

The watch's firmware operating system is based on a FreeRTOS kernel and uses Newlib, the STM32 Peripheral Lib, the Ragel state machine compiler, and an unnamed UTF-8 Decoder.

Gadgetbridge is an alternative companion application for Android. It is open source, does not require account creation, and supports features such as notifications, music playback and watch application installation/removal.

Linux users can access the Pebble using libpebble's tools enabling experimental alpha level services with several Linux distros including the Maemo OS Nokia N900. There is also a commercial app called Rockwatch for the Meego Linux OS Nokia N9 that provides services including managing the Pebble's firmware and apps running on the watch.

Pebble SDK 
Pebble Technology announced that an open Pebble software development kit (SDK) would be released before shipment of the watches began. A proof-of-concept watchface SDK and documentation were released on April 12, 2013. The released SDK was limited to development for watch faces, simple applications, and games. The second release of the SDK (renamed PebbleKit) was released on May 17, 2013, and added support for two-way communication between Pebbles and smartphones running iOS or Android via the AppMessage framework.

The 2.0 Pebble SDK, included APIs to access bluetooth messaging, background workers, the accelerometer, the compass, and Javascript apps. Applications written with the second PebbleKit SDK were not backwards compatible with 1.x apps, and developers were required to port their apps to the second-gen firmware.

Reception 
The original Pebble Smartwatch was released to mixed reviews. The design was acclaimed for being innovative. CNET praised the design, readability, and water-resistance of the Pebble Steel, but criticized the limit of eight user-installed apps and the lack of a heart-rate monitor. Later watches in the Pebble series were described similarly: as simple and effective but lacking some features of competitors like the Apple Watch.

Later generations

Pebble Time 

On February 24, 2015, Pebble announced the Pebble Time, their second-generation Pebble smartwatch via its Kickstarter campaign.

The Pebble Time Steel is a stainless steel variant of the Pebble Time smartwatch, available in multiple finishes: silver, black or gold with either a leather or steel band. Pebble claims it has a 10-day battery life.

The Pebble Time Round is also made of stainless steel and 2.5d gorilla glass with five finishes. Pebble claims it has a 2-day battery life, dramatically decreased because of the shape and size but still significantly longer-lasting than the Apple Watch's 16-hour life.

Hardware 
Pebble's second generation comes with various improvements over its predecessors, such as a 64-colour e-paper display with Gorilla Glass a thinner and more ergonomic chassis, plastic casing and a microphone. The Pebble Time retains the seven-day battery life and water resistance found on the previous two Pebble watches. It has a 150mAh battery.

Alongside the Pebble Time Steel, Pebble announced its open hardware platform called "Smartstraps". This lets developers develop new third-party straps that connects to a special port at the back of the watch and can add new features like GPS, heart rate monitors, extended battery life and other things to the watch. This new platform prevents smartwatch bloat and making the watch bulky like most of its competitors' smartwatches.

Software 
The Pebble Time also included a new interface designed around a timeline, which is similar to what is found in Google Now on Android Wear. In December 2015, all remaining Pebbles got a firmware update, enabling support for the timeline and removing the maximum of 8 apps-restriction, letting additional apps load directly from the connected phone. It is backwards compatible with all previous apps and watch faces.

Third parties have created apps for Pebble Time, such as contactless payment (tap to pay).

Funding and records 
The Pebble Time retailed for $199. The project reached its Kickstarter funding goal of $500,000 in 17 minutes. The project took 49 minutes to reach $1 million, which is a Kickstarter record. The project raised $10.3 million in 48 hours, another Kickstarter record. On March 3, 2015, Pebble Time became the most funded Kickstarter ever with nearly $14 million funded, while having 24 days left in its campaign. At the end of the funding, March 27, 2015, Pebble Time received pledges of $20,338,986 from 78,471 backers.

Pebble 2 
Pebble 2, the company's 3rd generation smartwatch, launched on Kickstarter on May 24, 2016, with an offer period of 36 days at discounted introductory pricing, and shipment of the new models anticipated in the October–November 2016 timeframe. Among the new features was a heart rate monitor (On +HR models), microphone, and water resistance rated for 30 m (98 ft) depth, Which was 10m less than the original Pebble because of the Pebble 2's Microphone. Many new features were documented as part of the Kickstarter prospectus, while other technical specifications of the forthcoming products are not yet disclosed.

The Pebble 2 product line added a new device called the Pebble Core, "a tiny wearable computer with Android 5.0" featuring a 3G modem, GPS, and Spotify integration backed by an open development community.
Pebble 2 was officially released in September 2016 with a new design and functions at $129. When Pebble sold parts of its company to Fitbit in late 2016, Gizmodo criticized the company for collecting $12.8 million in the product's Kickstarter and delaying shipments for half a year without being forthright with their supporters. Kickstarter backers who have not received the product were expected to receive refunds in 2017.

Closing of Pebble 

On December 7, 2016, Pebble Technology filed for insolvency with Fitbit acquiring much of the company's assets and employees. The selling of Pebble brand to Fitbit was credited to Charles River Ventures who invested $15 million in the company in 2013. The purchase excluded Pebble's hardware, as stated by Fitbit. The deal was focused on Pebble's software engineers and testers, and the acquisition of intellectual property such as the Pebble watch's operating system, watch apps, cloud services, and its patents.

Fitbit paid $23 million for Pebble's intellectual property, despite Pebble's debt and other obligations exceeding that. Fitbit did not take on Pebble's debt. The remainder of Pebble's assets, including product inventory and server equipment, was set to be sold off separately. Following the acquisition, Pebble's offices were closed and Fitbit held control over the use of the Pebble brand. The former Pebble engineers were relocated to Fitbit's offices in San Francisco. As a result, Pebble was forced to cancel shipments for its Pebble 2, Time 2, and Pebble Core smartwatches, refunding Kickstarter backers.

Rebble 
An unofficial developer group called Rebble was created to extend support for the Pebble watches' online services that were discontinued on June 30, 2018. Pebble users and enthusiasts created the Rebble.io website in December 2016 following the announcement of Pebble's shutdown. Users can switch their devices from the original Pebble web services to the Rebble Web Services to restore some of the lost features; some features require a US$3 monthly subscription to cover the costs.

See also 
 Pebble Time
 Wearable computer

References

External links 

 

Kickstarter-funded products
Products introduced in 2013
Products and services discontinued in 2016
Smartwatches
Watch brands
Wearable devices